The 12th Tank Battalion is an armored formation of the Ukrainian Ground Forces. The full name of the unit is 12th Independent Tank Battalion. The Battalion is located in Honcharivske.

History

Formation
Formation of the unit began towards the end of 2017, later during reform of units, planned size of unit  was increased.
On 12 June 2019, it was announced by Operational Command North that a new tank battalion was being formed in Honcharivske. Stationed in same town as 1st Tank Brigade, it is an Independent Battalion. A recruitment drive was held in Kyiv-Sviatoshyn Raion on 25 June and in Uman on 3 July 2019. Battalion received T-64BM "Bulat" tanks from 1st Tank Brigade and from reserve weapons depots. Battalions mission is to protect northern part of Chernihiv Oblast with support of 61st Jager Infantry Brigade.

Past commanders 
 
 Major Kaptan Oleksandr 2019 - 9 May 2021
 Major Hasparian Serhiy 9 May 2021 -

References

Battalions of Ukraine